Pembrokeshire County Council is the governing body for Pembrokeshire, one of the Principal Areas of Wales.

Political control
The first election to the council was held in 1995, initially operating as a shadow authority before coming into its powers on 1 April 1996. Since 1996 the majority of the seats on the council have always been held by independent councillors, with different groupings forming among the independents at different times. Elections normally take place every five years. The last elections were on 5 May 2022. The 2021 elections were postponed to 2022 to avoid a clash with the 2021 Senedd election.

Leadership
The leaders of the council since 1996 have been:

David Simpson was elected as the new council leader on 25 May 2017, after the previous leader Jamie Adams had withdrawn from the contest. The council had previously been controlled by the Independent Plus Political Group (IPPG), of which Adams was a member, but their numbers were reduced from 33 to 13 at the May 2017 election. Adams blamed the IPPG's close connections to the discredited former chief executive. Simpson is an independent councillor, leading a cross party "Democratic Coalition" of progressives and moderates.

Current composition
As at 10th March 2023:

Groups/Parties in the Democratic Coalition administration noted by (DC).

Elections

Party with the most elected councillors in bold. Coalition agreements in notes column.

Electoral divisions

Until the 2022 local elections the county was divided into 60 electoral divisions, each returning one councillor. Some of these divisions were coterminous with communities (parishes) of the same name. Most communities have their own elected council. There are ten town councils and 52 community councils in the county.

Following a boundary review, from the 2022 local elections the number of wards was reduced to 59, with one two-member ward.

The following table lists pre-2022 council divisions, communities, and associated geographical areas. Communities with a community council are indicated with a '*':

Premises
When created in 1996 the council inherited offices from the two predecessor authorities: Cambria House in Haverfordwest from Preseli Pembrokeshire District Council and Llanion Park in Pembroke Dock from South Pembrokeshire District Council. The first meeting of the new authority was held at Shire Hall, Haverfordwest, which had been the meeting place of the pre-1974 Pembrokeshire County Council. Subsequent meetings were held at Cambria House. It was decided shortly after the new council's creation to build a new headquarters adjoining Cambria House. The new building was named County Hall, with the first full council meeting in the new building being held in October 1999. Cambria House was demolished shortly afterwards. The new County Hall was formally opened by Queen Elizabeth II on 22 November 2001.

Criticism
The council received criticism for having leased a Porsche sports car for its former chief executive, Bryn Parry-Jones, who was paid £192,000 a year and then received a £277,000 pay-off when he left the post in 2014.

References

External links
 Pembrokeshire County Council

 
Pembrokeshire